Agniesebuurt is a neighborhood in Rotterdam, Netherlands in Rotterdam-Noord.

Agniesebuurt is located next to Rotterdam Centraal station and the Coolsingel.

Neighbourhoods of Rotterdam